Yevgeni Vladimirovich Zimin  (6 August 1947 – 28 December 2018) was a Soviet ice hockey player who played in the Soviet Hockey League.  He played for HC Spartak Moscow.  He was inducted into the Russian and Soviet Hockey Hall of Fame in 1968.

He died at the age of 71 in 2018. At the time of his death, he was a scout with the Philadelphia Flyers of the National Hockey League (NHL).

References

External links

 Russian and Soviet Hockey Hall of Fame bio

1947 births
2018 deaths
HC Spartak Moscow players
Honoured Masters of Sport of the USSR
Ice hockey commentators
Ice hockey players at the 1968 Winter Olympics
Ice hockey players at the 1972 Winter Olympics
Medalists at the 1968 Winter Olympics
Medalists at the 1972 Winter Olympics
Olympic gold medalists for the Soviet Union
Olympic medalists in ice hockey
Philadelphia Flyers scouts
Russian ice hockey coaches
Soviet ice hockey right wingers